Jason William Arnott (born October 11, 1974) is a Canadian former professional ice hockey player.

He began his National Hockey League career with the Edmonton Oilers in 1993–94 after being selected seventh overall in the 1993 NHL Entry Draft and was named to the NHL All-Rookie Team. A two-time NHL All-Star, Arnott won the Stanley Cup with the New Jersey Devils in 2000, scoring the championship-winning goal in the second overtime of Game 6. He played for the Dallas Stars before joining the Nashville Predators in 2006, where he served as captain for three seasons.

Playing career

Minor/Junior
Arnott grew up playing for his hometown Wasaga Beach Stars "DD" of the OMHA. In his Bantam year, he signed with the Stayner Siskins Jr. C. club of the OHA for the 1989–90 season. 

In 1990–91, Arnott played Jr.B. hockey for the Lindsay Century 21 Bears of the OHA. Later that year, he was selected in the first round, 16th overall, of the 1991 Ontario Hockey League (OHL) Priority Selection by the Oshawa Generals. He was then drafted by the Edmonton Oilers in the first round, seventh overall at the 1993 NHL Entry Draft following an impressive junior career with the Generals.

Professional
In 1993–94, as a rookie, Arnott played 78 games as a left winger, scoring 68 points and finishing as the runner-up to future teammate Martin Brodeur for the Calder Memorial Trophy for rookie of the year. On January 4, 1998, Arnott was traded to the New Jersey Devils along with Bryan Muir in exchange for Valeri Zelepukin and Bill Guerin. As a member of the "A Line" on the Devils with Patrik Eliáš and Petr Sýkora, he led the team to the 2000 Stanley Cup championship, scoring the Cup-winning goal at 8:20 of double overtime in Game 6 against the Dallas Stars.

On March 19, 2002, Arnott was traded to the Dallas Stars with Randy McKay in exchange for Joe Nieuwendyk and Jamie Langenbrunner. In 2005–06, Arnott had a career high 76 points for Dallas and scoring 32 goals, the most since his rookie season, in which he had 33. He also set a career high of 44 assists. In the off-season, he signed a five-year, $22.5 million contract as an unrestricted free agent with the Nashville Predators. He was named the Predators' fourth captain in the franchise's history on September 12, 2007.

On June 19, 2010, Arnott was traded back to his Stanley Cup-winning team, the New Jersey Devils, in exchange for forward Matt Halischuk and a second-round pick in 2011. This was the first-ever trade between the Devils and the Predators. With the Devils, Arnott played alongside captain Jamie Langenbrunner, his original counterpart in his trade to the Stars in 2002.

On February 28, 2011, Arnott was again traded away from the New Jersey Devils, this time to the Washington Capitals, in exchange for Dave Steckel and a second-round pick in 2012.

On March 9, 2011, Arnott recorded his 900th career point against the team that drafted him, the Edmonton Oilers, in a 5–0 shutout victory. On April 2, 2011, he scored his 400th career goal in a 5–4 overtime victory against the Buffalo Sabres. On July 6, 2011, Arnott signed a free agent contract with the St. Louis Blues.

After scoring 17 goals with 17 assists in 72 games during the 2011–12 season, the Blues opted not to re-sign Arnott. On January 26, 2013, he then signed a one-year deal with the New York Rangers worth approximately $1.6–$1.7 million. The deal, however, was not finalized when Arnott failed his physical and was not cleared to play by Rangers' doctors.

On November 5, 2013, Arnott announced his retirement from the NHL after 18 seasons in the NHL. In October 2014, it was announced that Arnott was hired as a part-time scout for the St. Louis Blues.

Awards
 Named to the NHL All-Rookie Team in 1994
 Played in the NHL All-Star Game in 1997 and 2008
 Won a Stanley Cup with the New Jersey Devils in 2000

Records
 Set the Nashville Predators record for most goals in one season, 33 in 2008–09. The record has since been surpassed by Viktor Arvidsson when he scored his 34th goal of the 2018–19 season on 4/7/2019.
 Scored the overtime Stanley Cup-winning goal with the New Jersey Devils in 2000

Personal life
Arnott was born in Collingwood, Ontario and was raised in Wasaga Beach.

Arnott's wife Dina is a former successful fashion model. Currently, she is an interior designer whose work has been published in Elle and House and Home. They reside in Dallas and Southern California with their 2 children, Chase and Lola. Arnott also has an older son, Draven, from a previous relationship who currently resides in Edmonton.

Arnott's cousins, Burke and Stacey Dales, were both professional athletes; Burke was a punter for nine seasons in the Canadian Football League who also attended training camp with the Pittsburgh Steelers, and Stacey was a two-time All-American in basketball at the University of Oklahoma who played five seasons in the Women's National Basketball Association and is currently a reporter for NFL Network.

Career statistics

Regular season and playoffs

International

See also
List of NHL players with 1,000 games played

References

External links
 
 Jason Arnott NHLPA profile 

1974 births
Living people
Canadian ice hockey centres
Dallas Stars players
Edmonton Oilers draft picks
Edmonton Oilers players
Ice hockey people from Simcoe County
Nashville Predators players
National Hockey League All-Stars
National Hockey League first-round draft picks
New Jersey Devils players
Oshawa Generals players
St. Louis Blues players
St. Louis Blues scouts
Stanley Cup champions
Washington Capitals players